Federica Rocco (born 1984) is a female water polo defender from Italy. Currently she is with the Padova water polo team.

References

External links
 

1984 births
Living people
Italian female water polo players
Water polo players at the 2008 Summer Olympics
Olympic water polo players of Italy
Date of birth missing (living people)
21st-century Italian women